Wolkowe  is a village in the administrative district of Gmina Myszyniec, within Ostrołęka County, Masovian Voivodeship, in east-central Poland. Wolkowe follows the Europe/Warsaw time zone.

The village has a population of 1,000.

References

Wolkowe